The Lagonda Club Building is a historic clubhouse in downtown Springfield, Ohio, United States.  Designed by Frank Mills Andrews, a leading period architect who was responsible for the construction of the Kentucky State Capitol, the clubhouse is a three-story structure with a large basement.  Various materials are present on different parts of the exterior — while the foundation and first story are constructed of dressed limestone, the second through fourth floors are built of brick; their only stone elements are stone trim around some of the windows.

Completed in 1895, the Lagonda Club is an early example of Beaux-Arts architecture.  This style was favored by Andrews, whose work appears to have been influenced by Louis Sullivan's preferred style.  After the Lagonda Club ceased to use the building, it became the headquarters of the local chamber of commerce.  Today, the property is again owned by the club (now known as "Club Lagonda"), which seeks to rent most of its space to businesses.  Because of its historically significant architecture and its place in Ohio's history, the Lagonda Club Building was listed on the National Register of Historic Places in 1975; at the same intersection is located another landmark, the former Warder Public Library.

References

Further reading
Prince, Benjamin F.  A Standard History of Springfield and Clark County, Ohio: An Authentic Narrative of the Past, With Particular Attention to the Modern Era in the Commercial, Industrial, Educational, Civic and Social Development.  Chicago and New York: American Historical Society, 1922.

Cultural infrastructure completed in 1895
Beaux-Arts architecture in Ohio
Chambers of commerce in the United States
Buildings and structures in Springfield, Ohio
National Register of Historic Places in Clark County, Ohio
Clubs and societies in the United States
Clubhouses on the National Register of Historic Places in Ohio